Three athletes from Denmark competed in five sports at the 1896 Summer Olympics in Athens.  Two of the three combined to win a gold medal, two silvers, and three bronzes, while Eugen Schmidt earned no medals.  Viggo Jensen contributed one of each color, while Holger Nielsen earned the second silver and two bronzes.  Shooting and weightlifting were Denmark's most successful sports.  Denmark had 15 entries in 12 events, winning six medals.

Medalists

Multiple medalists
The following competitors won multiple medals at the 1896 Olympic Games.

Competitors

| width=78% align=left valign=top |
The following is the list of number of competitors in the Games.

| width="22%" align="left" valign="top" |

Athletics

Denmark's three athletes had little success in the 100 metres or the discus throw.  Jensen took fourth place in the shot put competition, the closest to an athletics medal the Danish team came.

Track & road events

Field events

Fencing

One of Nielsen's two bronzes came in the fencing competition, in which he won half of his four matches.

Gymnastics

Jensen placed fourth of five competitors in the rope climbing contest, not reaching the top of the 14-metre rope.  His actual distance climbed is unknown but it was less than 12.5 metres, the distance of the bronze medallist.

Shooting

Jensen and Nielsen both earned bronze medals in the shooting competitions, with Nielsen also winning a silver medal.  Jensen specialized in the rifle events, taking 6th of 42 and 3rd of 20 in the two events.  Nielsen did not finish his rifle competition, but performed well in the pistol events, in which he won two medals and took 5th place of 16 in the third event.

Weightlifting

Jensen tied Launceston Elliot for weight lifted in the first event, the two handed lift.  Prince George of Greece, the judge for the event, determined that Jensen had lifted the 111.5 kilograms in better style than Elliot, awarded the Dane the gold medal.  In the second event, the one handed, Jensen's 57 kilograms were not close to Elliot's 71 kilograms and thus Jensen took second place in that event.

References

  (Digitally available at )
  (Excerpt available at )
 

Nations at the 1896 Summer Olympics
1896
Olympics